The Taman Connaught MRT station is an elevated rapid transit station on the MRT Kajang Line, located in Taman Connaught, Bandar Tun Razak constituency in southeastern Kuala Lumpur, Malaysia. Its exact location is next to the Cheras Sentral shopping mall, which is at Federal Route 1 Jalan Cheras near the northern end of the Cheras-Kajang Expressway, close to the Federal Territory Kuala Lumpur-Selangor border.

The station is also near to the Cheras-Kajang Interchange at the Sungai Besi-Ulu Kelang Elevated Expressway (SUKE) which is currently under construction. The elevated expressway will be even higher than the MRT track which is pretty high from the road.

It was opened on 17 July 2017, along with 19 adjoining stations (from Muzium Negara to Kajang) as part of Phase 2 of the system.

The station was thus provisionally named Phoenix Plaza station during construction. Plaza Phoenix was the former name of the Cheras Sentral Shopping Centre.

Station Background

Station Layout 
The station has a layout and design similar to that of most other elevated stations on the line (except the terminus and underground stations), with the platform level on the topmost floor, consisting of two sheltered side platforms along a double tracked line and a single concourse housing ticketing facilities between the ground level and the platform level. All levels are linked by lifts, stairways and escalators.

Exits and entrances
The station has three entrances - Entrance A and Entrance B on either side of Jalan Cheras, and Entrance C at Jalan 3/144A inside Taman Connaught. A link bridge also connects the station via the link bridges to Entrance A and Entrance C with the Cheras Sentral Shopping Mall.

Each entrance will have separate feeder bus service lines. Therefore, passengers are advised to ensure the correct entrance for the feeder bus line which they are going.

Bus Services

Feeder Bus Services 
With the opening of the MRT Kajang Line, feeder buses also began operating linking the station with several housing areas around the Taman Connaught, Sungai Besi, Cheras Awana and Alam Damai area.

The feeder bus lines in this station are operating in each of the entrances. Therefore, passengers are advised to ensure the correct entrance for the feeder bus line which they are going.

Other Bus Services 
The MRT Taman Connaught station also provides accessibility for some other bus services.

Planned Interchange
Taman Connaught station, or rather Plaza Phoenix station, was initially planned to be an interchange between the MRT Kajang Line and the MRT Putrajaya Line when the MRT lines were first announced. The alignments were later changed to the MRT Tun Razak Exchange station instead.

References

External links
 Taman Connaught MRT Station - mrt.com.my
 Klang Valley Mass Rapid Transit

Rapid transit stations in Kuala Lumpur
Sungai Buloh-Kajang Line
Railway stations opened in 2017